Leonce John "L. J." Sevin, Jr. (August 28, 1930 - September 12, 2015) was described by a Dallas newspaper, when he died, as "Mostek co-founder,
venture capitalist." He was also co-founder of Sevin Rosen Funds.

Career
Sevin co-founded Mostek when, in 1969, he left Texas Instruments; he was the company's CEO for ten years.

With Benjamin M. Rosen, he co-founded Sevin Rosen Funds in 1981.

Service
He served on the board at
 Institute of Technology at Southern Methodist University,
 the A. B. Freeman School of Business at Tulane University,
 the Bulova Watch Company and
 the Trade Policy Committee of the Semiconductor Industry Association.
 Dallas Opera Board of Directors

Early life
He was born to Leonce John Sevin, Sr. and Pauline Perkins Sevin in Baton Rouge. He fought in the Korean War and, with funding from the G. I. Bill, attended and graduated from Louisiana State University, with a Bachelor and Master of Science degrees in Electrical Engineering.

In 1965, while working for TI, he wrote a book, "Field Effect Transistors" that was translated into seven languages.

Family
When Sevin died, his family included wife Jo Danna Sevin, daughters Christine Sevin Burke and Paula Sevin Webster Hayes, son Gordon Sevin, two grandchildren and a great-grandchild.

In 1982 daughter Joana Sevin "died in an automobile accident."

References

1930 births
2015 deaths
American company founders
American technology chief executives